Snailking is the second album by Italian doom metal power trio Ufomammut, released in 2004.

Track listing

References

2004 albums
Ufomammut albums